Balcatta Etna Football Club is an Australian semi-professional soccer club based in Balcatta, Perth, Western Australia. They compete in the National Premier Leagues Western Australia.

History
In the park of St. Lawrence Church, Main Street, Balcatta, a group of friends started to kick a football to end the boredom of the Sunday afternoons. Little did they know that this was the beginning of Balcatta Etna Soccer Club. Within a short time the number of friends who wanted to play football grew dramatically as did the number of spectators.

The much-developed interest between the group of friends brought about the idea of forming a football team, and within several days a committee was formed. The majority of members were originally from a town called Ucria (province of Messina), Sicily. This being the case, it was decided to call the newborn club by a Sicilian symbol “Etna” being the largest volcano in Europe. After several months of preparation, the club was accepted as a member of the Soccer Federation of Western Australia and became officially known as Balcatta Etna Soccer Club.

In the first year, 1978, playing at the new home ground, Reader Reserve in Hector St, Mt Yokine. Etna acquired fifth position on the ladder. In the second year, 1979, Etna finished seventh position on the ladder. In the same year, a ladies committee was formed and a house was rented at 70 McDonald Street, Osborne Park for use as clubrooms.

The following year in 1980, a youth committee was formed for the purpose of helping promote the club. The management committee decided to strengthen the team and with the addition of new players, promotion was achieved from 4th to 3rd Division.

In 1982 the club amalgamated with the Balcatta Cats Junior Soccer Club, which led to expansion of the club. It was decided that a larger ground was needed to accommodate the increase in numbers and in 1985, the club was granted approval to use Grindleford Reserve (now Graham Burkett Reserve). For the following two years the club maintained a strong position in the senior rankings and the junior teams increased rapidly.

In 1987 the management committee decided to amalgamate with Perth Azzuri Soccer Club (now Perth SC) and East Fremantle Tricolore Soccer Club (now Fremantle City Football Club) and after numerous meetings and discussions the Perth Italia Soccer Club was formed. Representatives from all 3 clubs strongly contributed in establishing the finest football facilities in Western Australia at Dorrien Gardens.

For the next 3 years, Balcatta Etna did not field any senior teams and concentrated on promoting and improving the junior teams. In 1991, the management committee decided to enter a senior team to play in the Professional Soccer 3rd Division Competition. With the introduction of new coaches, players and an existing strong juniors camp.

It was the start of a new era. In 1993 the club took the step in fielding a senior women’s team. The girls finished the season being runners up in the final of the night series competition, won the Top Four Cup and the Premiership to gain promotion to 1st Division. It was no surprise that in the 1994 season, with so much talent, eleven of the girls were chosen to represent Western Australia in various age groups.

However, the clubrooms, which were built on a rubbish dump, were literally sinking into the ground. Walls started to crack and in 1994 discussions commenced with the local council to build new clubrooms. 1994 was a historic year in that the management committee decided to change the club's name to Balcatta Soccer Club. The seniors finished the season in 2nd position and were promoted to the 2nd Division.

In 1996, the senior’s team was promoted to the 1st Division and the committee’s main goal was to successfully complete the new clubrooms. With the assistance of the local council, club sponsors and dedicated committee members, the new clubrooms were completed and officially opened in 1997. 1998 was the most successful year on the park, with the seniors team qualifying for the semi-finals in the Night Series and achieving runners up in the final of the West Ham United FC Cup. One of the more pleasing aspect of the season was the development of some of the youth introduced to play at senior level. And the results of youth development proved a success when in 1999 the seniors team finished the season in the top five group.

With the appointment of a youth development officer in 2000, the club concentrated on improving the soccer skills of their youth players. This would enable the club to be in a position to offer a solid future for soccer within the community. In 2001, a sponsorship committee was formed and a target was set for them to achieve. The target was surpassed with ease and beyond the original expectations. With the continued hard work from the sponsorship committee the club continues to be amongst the top soccer clubs in Western Australia.

In 2002, a youth Committee was formed and they organized over 20 Xplosionz Under 18’s Dance Parties which were very popular and attended by up to 1000 people each month. They not only raised valuable funds for the club, but they also donated over $10,000.00 to Charity, including a live interview on Telethon.

In 2006, Elisa D'Ovidio who played for the Premier Women’s Team in the highest league in Western Australia, won the Fairest & Best in the league and also won the Golden Boot Award for the leading goal scorer. On 17 August 2006 the good work of Balcatta Soccer Club was mentioned several times in Parliament House Canberra in a speech by Federal Member Michael Keenan.

In 2013 the club changed its name from Balcatta Soccer Club to Balcatta FC.

On 30th November 2021, the club re-branded and officially became Balcatta Etna FC.

Colours and Badge
The major colours for Balcatta Etna are blue and red.

The Balcatta Etna badge contains three sections. The top section shows the clubs Italian heritage through the Italian flag and the words 'Balcatta Etna FC' beneath it. On the bottom left, the two main colours blue and red are displayed in vertical stripes. Next to it is Mount Etna erupting a football, showing the cultural heritage of the clubs founders.

Stadium
Balcatta Etna play their home matches at Grindleford Reserve, which has grandstand seating for 240 supporters. In December 2022, works started to upgrade the lighting on the training pitches and to install match lights on the main pitch for the first time in the clubs history.

Current First Team Mens Squad

First Team Mens Coaching Staff
 Head coach: Glen Grostate
 Football Operations Manager: Nicholas Cooper
 Goalkeeping coach: James Turvill
 Assistant coach: Malcolm Tshuma
 Assistant coach: Jeff Imrie
 Assistant coach: David Frew
 Team Manager: Nick Ford
 Property & Kit Manager: Paul Calcei
 Physiotherapist: Trent Raykos
 Technical director: Fadi Ma'ayah

Honours
 Football West State League
 Minor Premiers: 2011
Coach of the Year: Michael Roki 2011
Player of the Year Steve Burton 2011

Football West State League Division 1
Winners: 2009
Night Series Winners: 2008
Coach of the Year: Salv Todaro  2009

Football West State League Division 2
Winners:1981

Women's team
The Balcatta Etna Women's team are one of the inaugural teams in the new National Premier Leagues WA Women competition (which commenced in 2020), and is a part of the National Premier Leagues Women’s structure. Previously they had been a part of the Women's Premier League competition (2018–2019), and were Champions in the 2018 season. Prior to that, they were a part of the Women's State League Premier Division (since at least 2007).

References

External links
Official website

National Premier Leagues clubs
Soccer clubs in Perth, Western Australia
1977 establishments in Australia
Association football clubs established in 1977
Italian-Australian backed sports clubs of Western Australia